Saudi Arabian Industrial Investments Company (Dussur) is a Saudi government company established in 2014 at Saudi Arabia for the development of strategic industrial investments. As of April 2019, its CEO is Raed Al-Rayes. Its shareholders include Public Investment Fund, Saudi Aramco, and SABIC.

“Dussur” translates to ropes in Arabic.

See also
List of companies of Saudi Arabia
Saudi Aramco

References

2014 establishments in Saudi Arabia
Government-owned companies of Saudi Arabia
Companies based in Riyadh
Saudi Arabian brands
Public Investment Fund